List of motorcycles in the National Motor Museum, Beaulieu in the U.K..

Notes

Motorcycle museums in the United Kingdom
Lists of motorcycles
Technology collections